Shady El Nahas (born March 27, 1998) is a Canadian judoka.

Career
When El Nahas was young, he immigrated to Canada from Egypt, and took up the sport of judo for self-defence against bullying at school.

In November 2018, El Nahas won silver at the Osaka Grand Slam, and the following year he followed that up with a bronze at the 2019 Ekaterinburg Grand Slam.

El Nahas also won gold at the 2019 Pan American Judo Championships in Lima, Peru and in 2020.

In June 2021, El Nahas was named to Canada's 2020 Olympic team.

Personal life
El Nahas was born in Alexandria, Egypt and moved to Canada with his family at the age of 12. The family initially lived in Toronto though he moved to Montreal to join the national Canadian judo team where he trains with them today. His older brother Mohab El Nahas is also a member of the national Canadian judo team.

See also
 Judo in Ontario
 Judo in Canada
 List of Canadian judoka

References

External links
 

1998 births
Living people
Canadian male judoka
York University alumni
Canadian people of Egyptian descent
Judoka at the 2020 Summer Olympics
Olympic judoka of Canada
Judoka at the 2022 Commonwealth Games
Commonwealth Games gold medallists for Canada
Medallists at the 2022 Commonwealth Games